Christian Vásquez (born 1984, Caracas, Venezuela) is a Venezuelan conductor and violinist.

Vásquez began to study violin at age 9, after being accepted to the El Sistema program in Venezuela, and he played in the Sinfónica Infantil de San Sebastián de los Reyes.  In 2001, at age 17, he began conducting studies with José Antonio Abreu.  In 2005, Vásquez became music director of the Sinfónica Juvenil de Aragua José Félix Ribas (José Felix Ribas Juvenile Symphony Orchestra of Aragua).  In 2009, Vásquez was named a Gustavo Dudamel conducting fellow with the Los Angeles Philharmonic.  He is currently music director of the Teresa Carreño Youth Orchestra of Venezuela.

In Europe, Vásquez first conducted the Gävle Symphony Orchestra in October 2009.  In November 2010, he took up the post of principal guest conductor of the Gävle Symphony Orchestra, and held the post until 2013.  Vásquez first appeared as a guest conductor with the Stavanger Symphony Orchestra (SSO) in March 2010.  In September 2011, the SSO announced the appointment of Vásquez as its next chief conductor, as of the 2013-2014 season, for an initial contract of 4 years.  He concluded his SSO tenure at the end of the 2018-2019 season.

References

External links
 Askonas Holt agency biography of Vásquez
 Karen Wada, "Dudamels in the making? L.A. Phil names conducting fellows".  Los Angeles Times "Culture Monster" blog, 30 April 2009

 

1984 births
Venezuelan conductors (music)
Male conductors (music)
Living people
21st-century conductors (music)
21st-century male musicians